Pietro Pastorino (2 November 1900 – 2 October 1980) was an Italian sprinter. He competed in the men's 200 metres at the 1924 Summer Olympics.

References

External links
 

1900 births
1980 deaths
Athletes (track and field) at the 1924 Summer Olympics
Italian male sprinters
Olympic athletes of Italy
Place of birth missing
Italian Athletics Championships winners